Dangerous Darkies a former South African association football club from Nelspruit. The club played in the National Soccer League from 1991–92. In the late 1990s the club merged with the other big Mpumalanga team Witbank Aces to form Mpumalanga Black Aces F.C.

League Placing

References 

Association football clubs established in 1991
Mbombela
Defunct soccer clubs in South Africa
Soccer clubs in Mpumalanga
1991 establishments in South Africa